Lucasium iris, the Gilbert ground gecko, is a gecko endemic to Australia.

References

Lucasium
Reptiles described in 2020
Geckos of Australia
Endemic fauna of Australia